Warren Fisher is an Australian former rugby league footballer who played in the 1970s.

Playing career
Fisher was originally from Manilla, New South Wales, and came to Cronulla-Sutherland in 1973. Remembered as a sparkling fullback, Fisher played in the 1973 Grand Final in his debut year. Unfortunately, he left the field during the 1973 grand final due to a broken rib that punctured his lung. He returned the following year to play five more seasons with Cronulla until retiring at the end of the 1978 NSWRFL season.

References

Living people
Australian rugby league players
Cronulla-Sutherland Sharks players
Rugby league fullbacks
Rugby league players from New South Wales
Year of birth missing (living people)